The Socotra rock gecko (Pristurus sokotranus) is a species of lizard in the Sphaerodactylidae family found on Socotra Island.

References

Pristurus
Reptiles described in 1938
Endemic fauna of Socotra